Ochyroceratidae is a six-eyed spider family, with 165 described species in ten genera. They are common inhabitants of caves and the tropical forest litter of South Africa, the Caribbean, Asia and South America. Considered an ecological counterpart of the Linyphiidae of the northern temperate zone, species are especially diverse in the Indo-Pacific region.

These spiders build small, irregular sheet-webs in dark, damp places and typically carry eggs in their chelicerae until they hatch. Differences between males and females are still relatively unknown, but at least one species in the genus Theotima (T. minutissima) was shown to be parthenogenetic.

Genera

, the World Spider Catalog accepts the following genera:
Dundocera Machado, 1951 — Angola
Euso Saaristo, 2001 — Seychelles
Fageicera Dumitrescu & Georgescu, 1992 — Cuba, Colombia
Lundacera Machado, 1951 — Angola
Ochyrocera Simon, 1892 — Caribbean, South America, Mexico, Guatemala, Samoa
Ouette Saaristo, 1998 — China, Seychelles
Psiloochyrocera Baert, 2014 — Ecuador
Roche Saaristo, 1998 — Seychelles
Speocera Berland, 1914 — South America, Africa, Asia, Oceania, Cuba
Theotima Simon, 1893 — Panama, Mexico, Caribbean, South America, Africa, Germany
†Priscaleclercera Wunderlich 2017 — Burmese amber, Myanmar, Cenomanian

See also
 List of Ochyroceratidae species

References

External links

 National Geographic (2004): "New" Spider Species Weaves Uncommonly Regular Webs
 

 
Cave spiders
Araneomorphae families